The Asociación de Estados Iberoamericanos para el Desarrollo de las Bibliotecas Nacionales de Iberoamérica (ABINIA) is an association of Ibero-American national libraries. It began in Mexico on 14 December 1989 as the Asociación de Bibliotecas Nacionales de Iberoamérica (Association of Ibero-American National Libraries). In 1999 the group adopted its current name. As of 2019 it operates from headquarters in Caracas, Venezuela. Official languages of the group are Spanish and Portuguese.

Members

References

External links 
 Official site

National libraries
Library-related professional associations
International educational organizations
1989 establishments in Mexico
Ibero-America